Yoo Yong-sung (born 25 October 1974) is a retired badminton player from South Korea. He is two time Olympic silver medalist.

Achievements

Olympic Games 
Men's doubles

World Championships 
Men's doubles

World Cup 
Men's doubles

Asian Games 
Men's doubles

Mixed doubles

Asian Championships 
Men's doubles

Mixed doubles

Asian Cup 
Men's doubles

Mixed doubles

East Asian Games
Men's doubles

Mixed doubles

IBF World Grand Prix 
The World Badminton Grand Prix sanctioned by International Badminton Federation (IBF) since 1983.

Men's doubles

Mixed doubles

IBF International 
Men's doubles

References

External links
 
 
 
 

South Korean male badminton players
1974 births
Living people
People from Dangjin
Badminton players at the 1996 Summer Olympics
Badminton players at the 2000 Summer Olympics
Badminton players at the 2004 Summer Olympics
Olympic badminton players of South Korea
Olympic silver medalists for South Korea
Olympic medalists in badminton
Medalists at the 2000 Summer Olympics
Medalists at the 2004 Summer Olympics
Badminton players at the 1994 Asian Games
Badminton players at the 1998 Asian Games
Badminton players at the 2002 Asian Games
Asian Games gold medalists for South Korea
Asian Games silver medalists for South Korea
Asian Games bronze medalists for South Korea
Asian Games medalists in badminton
Medalists at the 1994 Asian Games
Medalists at the 1998 Asian Games
Medalists at the 2002 Asian Games
World No. 1 badminton players
Sportspeople from South Chungcheong Province